William MacGregor  (1846–1919) was a Lieutenant-Governor of British New Guinea, Governor of Newfoundland and Governor of Queensland.

William or Bill(y) MacGregor may also refer to:

 Sir William Macgregor, 2nd Baronet (1817–1846), British Army officer
 William MacGregor (Australian politician) (1853–1899), New South Wales politician
 William York Macgregor (1855–1923), Scottish landscape painter
 William MacGregor (judge) (1862–1934), New Zealand King's Counsel
 William Firth MacGregor (1896–?), painter, illustrator and artist
 William Macgregor (cricketer) (1888–1980), Australian cricketer and veterinarian

Characters
Bill MacGregor, character on Second Thoughts
Billy MacGregor, character in Head of the Class and Billy

Musicians
Will MacGregor, musician in Fear
Bill MacGregor, musician in High Holy Days

See also
William McGregor (disambiguation)
William Gregor (1761–1817), British clergyman and mineralogist